Talmadge, California may refer to:

 Talmadge, San Diego, a neighborhood
 Talmage, California in Mendocino County